is a passenger railway station in located in the city of Neyagawa, Osaka Prefecture, Japan, operated by the private railway company Keihan Electric Railway.

Lines
Kōrien Station is served by the  Keihan Main Line, and is located 17.6 km from the starting point of the line at Yodoyabashi Station.

Station layout
The station has two island platforms connected by an elevated station building.

Platforms

Adjacent stations

History
It was renamed on April 1, 1938.

Future plans 
The facilities are expected to be moved to a new elevated station by 2028. Construction has been in progress since September 2022.

Passenger statistics
In fiscal 2019, the station was used by an average of 59,025 passengers daily.

Surrounding area
 Kōrien Daiei Hondori Shopping Street (using the west exit, 4 minutes on foot)
 Kōrien station square shopping street (using the west exit, 1 minute walk)
 Kōrien Chuo Shopping Street (using the west exit, 6 minutes walk to the north)
 Kōrien Shinmachi Shopping Street

References

External links

Official home page 

Railway stations in Japan opened in 1910
Railway stations in Osaka Prefecture
Neyagawa, Osaka